The Battle of the Vistula River, also known as the Battle of Warsaw, was a Russian victory against the German Empire and Austria-Hungary on the Eastern Front during the First World War.

Background
The armies that the Russian commander Grand Duke Nicholas was assembling in Poland were still enlarging,  including the arrival of crack troops from Siberia, freed by the Japanese declaration of war against Germany on 23 August. Stavka (Russian supreme headquarters) intended for the forces assembled south of Warsaw—500,000 men and 2,400 guns—to march west to invade the German industrial area of Upper Silesia, which was almost undefended. On their Eastern Front the Germans had  only one army, the Eighth, which was in East Prussia. It already had mauled two Russian armies at Tannenberg and at the First Battle of the Masurian Lakes. To support the reeling Austro-Hungarian Armies, OHL (Oberste Heeresleitung, German supreme headquarters) formed a new German Ninth Army in Silesia,  to be commanded by General Richard von Schubert, with Erich Ludendorff, transferred from  Eighth  army, as chief of staff. Ludendorff quickly evaluated the situation in Silesia and convinced the new commander at OHL, Erich von Falkenhayn, to strengthen the Ninth Army and also to make Paul von Hindenburg commander of both German armies in the east. 

By the end of September, Ninth Army, with headquarters in Breslau, consisted of the XVII, XX, XI, Guard Reserve Corps, Graf von Bredow's Landwehr Division, 8th Cavalry Division, and the 35th Reserve Division, with Woyrsch's Landwehr Corps linking the German Army with the Austro-Hungarian forces on the right.  According to Prit Buttar, "Several Siberian divisions were now gathered around Warsaw, and it seemed likely that these would march southwest to support a westerly drive by the forces of Southwest Front.  In order to oppose this, Conrad and Ludendorff agreed, the k.u.k. Army would extend its northern flank north of the Vistula, and the German Ninth Army would then take up positions alongside."  On 28 September, the Germans started their advance, while Dankl's First Army crossed the Vistula, reaching Bogoria on 1 October.  On 30 September, the Germans reached Przedbórz, and Radom five days later.  The Russian response was for Ruzsky to advance towards Kalisz, while Ivanov's Second, Fourth, Ninth, and Fifth Armies concentrated along the Vistula.  The Russian Third and Eighth armies would remain in Galicia.

Engagement of Opatów-Klimontów
To face the threat from Silesia, the Russians withdrew men from East Prussia and from the front facing the Austro-Hungarians The geographical barrier that separated the bulk of the opposing armies was the Vistula River.  The Russian corps marching north to fill the gap moved along the east bank of the Vistula, which protected their left flanks. The troop movements involved  both the Southwest Front commanded by Nikolai Ivanov and the Northwest Front under Nikolai Ruzsky. Their movements were poorly  coordinated.

To guard the crossings for their Fourth and Ninth Armies, on the west bank of the Vistula the Russians deployed the 75th  Reserve Division (Fourth Army) at Radom, as well as the group of General Delsalle, consisting of the Guard Rifle Brigade, 2nd Rifle Brigade and 80th  Reserve Division, at Opatów-Klimontów. Both groups were screened by the Cavalry divisions of the Corps Nowikow.

On 28 September German Ninth  Army began a meticulously planned advance toward the Vistula  River.  German XI, Guard and Austro-Hungarian I Corps marched in heavy rain toward Delsalle's group. Because German Army wagons were too heavy for the woeful Polish roads,  submerged in several feet of mud,  they used light Polish carts hired along with their peasant drivers.  As they advanced they improved the roads and bridges so they could support heavy artillery and adjusted the rails to the narrower European gauge.   (The Vienna-Warsaw line was already European gauge.)   Explosives were cached at road and railway bridges so  they could be destroyed if necessary.  

On 6 October, Dankl's First Army cavalry had reached Sandomierz, and though the Russians lost 7000 of General Delsalle's infantry killed or taken prisoner near Opatów, the remaining forces had withdrawn across the Vistula. On 7 October, Archduke Joseph Ferdinand's Fourth Army captured Rzeszów, while Svetozar Boroević's Third Army advanced towards Przemyśl.  On 11 October, Austro-Hungarian troops captured Jarosław, and 5000 prisoners, but once, again, the Russians were able to withdraw across the San River.

Battle

The Germans reached the Vistula River on 9 October. The few Russian bridgeheads on the west bank were invested. Only small Russian pockets remained on the west bank; they were excellent targets for the German artillery. General Nikolai Ruzsky, commander of the Russian Northwest Front, sent troops from Warsaw to attack XVII Corps on the German left flank. Orders found on the body of a Russian officer revealed that 14 Russian divisions were concentrating against Mackensen's five divisions. The Germans were also privy to Russian movements from intercepted wireless messages. Unlike the messages sent in the clear during the first weeks of the war, now they were in the new Russian code, which by the end of September had been broken by a German reserve officer, Professor Deubner. Three Russian armies were concentrating against German Ninth Army, relieving the pressure on the Austro-Hungarians in the south. 

On 10 October, the Russians were ordered to attack from their positions along the Vistula.  The Russian Fourth Army was deployed with its XIV, XVII and Guards Corps along the lower San and Vistula.  North of them was the Ninth Army with the XVI, Grenadier, and III Caucasian Corps.  Fifth Army was still be deployed north of them, while closest to Warsaw was the Second Army, consisting of I, XXVII and II Siberian Corps.  On 13 October, Grand Duke Nikolai placed command of the Second and Fifth Russian armies under the command of the Northwest Front, responsible for the major thrust into Poland, while the Southwest Front tied down the German and Austro-Hungarian armies along the Vistula. However, on 11 October, the German Ninth Army XVII Corps, under the command of Mackensen, was to attack Warsaw, securing the Ninth Army's northern flank.  

Mackensen was within  of Warsaw, when a set of orders were found on a Russian staff officer corpse.  According to Buttar, "For the first time, the Germans became aware that they were facing no fewer than four Russian armies, which intended to roll up the German line from the north.  It now became the intention of Hindenburg and Ludendorff to try to tie down as much of the Russian strength as possible, thus allowing the k.u.k. Army to achieve a victory against weaker forces in the south."  On 10 October, Conrad ordered the Austro-Hungarian Third and Fourth Armies to cross the San, but by 12 October they had not made any headway, even the First Army failed to establish a bridgehead.  Though the Austro-Hungarians had 36 divisions in Galicia compared to 26 for the Russians, but the Russians had more guns, and were fighting from defensive positions.  On 11 October, Conrad sent the First Army's V Corps to Ożarów to reinforce the Germans along the left bank of the Vistula.  On 12 October, the Russians succeeded in establishing a bridgehead at Ivangorod.  The Russians attacked Mackensen on 16 October after two days of bombardment.  Ludendorff requested Conrad send his First Army in response, but Conrad only agreed to send his 7th Cavalry Division.  Macksen's eastern flank was threatened as Phleve's Russian Fifth Army crossed the Vistula.  Asked if he could hold his position until 18 October, allowing Hindenburg to withdraw to the southwest, Mackensen responded, "I will hold until 19 October."  By then Russian cavalry had bypassed his western flank and threatened to cut him off to the south.  Mackensen was then forced to withdraw, while Grand Duke Nikolai ordered a general offensive for 20 October.

By 20 October, Radko Dimitriev's Russian Third Army had established 5 bridgeheads across the San, which Ferdinand's Austro-Hungarian Fourth Army was unable to dislodge.  On 22 October, Aleksei Brusilov's Russian Eighth Army recaptured Stryj.  As the German and Austro-Hungarian forces withdrew to the west, Conrad planned an ambush of the Russians crossing at Ivangorod.  As Sergei Sheydeman's Russian Second Army advanced, Dankl's First Army was to strike north against the southern flank of the Russian bridgehead on 22 October. Dankl's attack faltered, while the next day his eastern flank was threatened by Russian troops crossing the Vistula at Puławy.  According to Buttar, "Conrad's plan to crush the Russians in the process of crossing the river, always a risky venture, would now face the combined strength of the Russian Fourth and Ninth Armies."  As the German Guards Reserve Corps advanced towards Kozienice, at the western end of the Ivangorod bridgehead, another Russian bridgehead opened at Kazimierz Dolny, to the rear of Dankl's eastern front.  On 25 October, the Russians advanced.  On 26 October, the German Guards Reserve Corps retreated towards the southwest, along with the German Ninth Army to avoid its western flank from being turned, forcing Dankl's First Army to also retreat.

The Austro-Hungarian First Army, which was taking over the German right flank, was unable to  defend the crossings over the Vistula.  The Germans claimed that they deliberately allowed the Russians to cross, then intending to engulf them. According to the  Austro-Hungarians they  arrived too late  to prevent  the crossings. In any event, the Russians were able to bring enough men quickly over the river to force the Austro-Hungarians to retreat to a line  ,to the west. According to Max Hoffmann, the third ranking member of Ninth Army Staff,  they pulled back without  alerting the nearby German units—they escaped only because they were warned by a German telephone operator.   In fact the Austro-Hungarians did properly inform their allies

Aftermath
According to Buttar, "Both the German and the Austro-Hungarian commanders attempted to emphasise that they had been forced to retreat because their allies had not delivered what was required. Despite taking an estimated 12,000 Russian prisoners, First Army had lost over 40,000 men, and had failed to eliminate any of the Russian bridgeheads across the Vistula."  On 30 October, the Russians reached Łódź. 

They portrayed the withdrawal as a strategic maneuver, and had succeeded in blocking an enemy advance into Germany for weeks, while their army was trying to win on the Western Front. The retreat "... filled the Russian army with confidence in its strength to deal with Germany". Now Russian troops  had beaten both Germans and the Austro-Hungarians. But they dissipated their advantage by indecision about their next move and confusion in their administrative arrangements 

On 1 November, Hindenburg was given command of all of the German forces on the Eastern Front.  Mackensen was promoted as commander of the Ninth Army, the majority of which was deployed by rail to Thorn, so as to threaten the Russian northern flank.  Yet, for the Austro-Hungarian forces, in the words of Buttar, "All the gains of the October campaign were to be abandoned, and a new line would be held through the winter, running along the Carpathians and then to Krakow."

Order of battle on 1 October 1914

Russian forces
Russian North-Western Front. Commander-in-chief – Nikolai Ruzsky
 Prinarevskaya (Narew) Group. Commander – Bobyrev
 Warsaw fortifications XXVII. Corps (63rd & 77th Infantry Divisions)
Novogeorgiyevsk Fortress garrison (79th Infantry Division & one brigade of 2nd Infantry Division)
6th Cavalry & Caucasus Cavalry Divisions, Guards Cossack Brigade (Cossack Division "Kasnakov"), 1st Astrakhan Cossack Regiment
2nd Army. Commander – Sergei Scheidemann
End of Sept. consisted of:
I. Corps (22nd & 24th Infantry Divisions)
XXIII. Corps (3rd Guards Infantry Division, one brigade of 2nd Infantry Division, 1st Rifle Brigade)
2nd Army Reinforcements:
II. Corps (26th & 43rd Infantry Divisions) transferred 3 Oct from 1st Army
I. Siberian Corps (1st & 2nd Siberian Rifle Divisions) Arrived in Warsaw 27 September – October 1 from the interior
II. Siberian Corps (4th & 5th Siberian Rifle Divisions) diverted to Warsaw from 10th Army; arrived 8 Oct
50th Infantry Division 10 Oct arrived in Warsaw from St. Petersburg
IV. Corps (30th & 40th Infantry Divisions) mid-Oct: Arrived in Warsaw from 1st Army
VI. Siberian Corps (13th & 14th Siberian Rifle Divisions) late Sept: the divisions arrived in the Warsaw area from the interior and initially operated independently; by mid-Oct they were controlled by VI Siberian Corps staff.
Units of Cavalry Corps Novikov (see below) mid-Oct arrived in Warsaw
4th Army. Commander – Alexei Evert
Grenadier Corps (1st & 2nd Grenadier Divisions)
III. Caucasus Corps (21st & 52nd Infantry Divisions)
XVI. Corps (41st & 47th Infantry Divisions)
Ivangorod Fortress garrison (75th & 81st Infantry Divisions)
Ural Cossack Division
Cavalry Corps Novikov (5th, 8th & 14th Cavalry Divisions, Turkestan Cossack Brigade and 4th & 5th Don Cossack Divisions) [8 Oct: 8th Cavalry Division & Turkestan Cossack Brigade attached to 5th Army; rest of corps sent to Warsaw, arriving 14 Oct].
9th Army. Commander – Platon Lechitsky
Guard Corps (1st & 2nd Guard Infantry Divisions, Guards Rifle Brigade)
XVIII. Corps (23rd & 37th Infantry Divisions)
XIV. Corps (18th & 45th Infantry Divisions, 2nd Rifle Brigade)
13th Cavalry Division, Guards Separate Cavalry Brigade (Mannheim)
5th Army. Commander – Pavel Plehve
XVII. Corps (3rd & 35th Infantry Divisions)
XXV. Corps (3rd Grenadier & 46th Infantry Divisions)
V. Corps (7th & 10th Infantry Divisions)
80th Infantry Division
1st Don Cossack Division

Central Powers Forces
9th Army (German) Commander – Paul von Hindenburg (all units are German unless otherwise indicated)
Guard Reserve Corps (3rd Guard Infantry & 1st Guard Reserve Divisions)
XI. Corps (22nd & 38th Infantry Divisions)
XVII. Corps (35th & 36th Infantry Divisions)
XX. Corps (37th & 41st Infantry Divisions; mid-Oct: reinforced with Austrian 3rd Cavalry Division))
Landwehr Corps "Woyrsch" (3rd & 4th Landwehr Infantry Divisions)
Combined Corps "Frommel" (8th Cavalry Division, 35th Reserve Division, Landwehr Division "Bredow", 21st Landwehr Brigade; mid-Oct: reinforced with Austrian 7th Cavalry Division)
Landsturm Brigades Rintelen, Hoffman & Westernhagen
1st Army (Austria-Hungary) Commander – Viktor Dankl (all units are Austro-Hungarian)
I. Corps (5th & 12th Infantry Divisions, 46th Landwehr Division, 35th Austrian Landsturm Brigade, Polish Legion)
V. Corps (14th & 33rd Infantry Divisions, 1st Austrian Landsturm Brigade – mid-Oct: Brigade transferred to 4th Army)
X. Corps (2nd & 24th Infantry Divisions, 45th Landwehr Division)
37th Honved Infantry Division & 106th Austrian Landstrum Division, 100th Hungarian, 101st Hungarian & 110th Hungarian Landstrum Brigades (mid-Oct: 110th Landsturm Brigade transferred to 4th Army).
Cavalry Corps "Korda" (3rd & 7th Cavalry Divisions; mid-Oct: both divisions transferred to 9th Army)
Reinforcements:
Early Oct: 43rd Landwehr Division
Cavalry Corps "Hauer" (2nd & 9th Cavalry Divisions)
 23 October: 11th Cavalry Division

References

Additional Reading
Tucker, Spencer The Great War: 1914–18 (1998)
Glaise-Horstenau, Edmund Österreich-Ungarns letzter Krieg 1914-1918. Erster Band. Das Kriegsjahr 1914 (1931)
Bleibtreu, Karl Bismarck, Band 3
Zapolowski, Wladimir, Zapolovskyi, Mykola (2021). Der Bewegungskrieg an der mittleren Weichsel von Oktober bis Anfang November 1914. Pallasch : Zeitschrift für Militärgeschichte : Organ der Österreichischen Gesellschaft für Herreskunde. Vol. 76, pp. 113-125. ISBN 978-3-902721-76-1

Vistula River
the Vistula River
Vistula River
Vistula River
Poland in World War I
Ukraine in World War I
History of Lesser Poland
History of Łódź Voivodeship
History of Lviv Oblast
History of Masovian Voivodeship
History of Podkarpackie Voivodeship
History of Świętokrzyskie Voivodeship
the Vistula River
1914 in the Russian Empire
September 1914 events
October 1914 events